Jordi Solé may refer to:
 Jordi Solé Tura (1930–2009), Spanish politician and jurist
 Jordi Solé i Ferrando (born 1976), Spanish politician